Strangefolk is the third studio album by English psychedelic rock band Kula Shaker, the first album since the band reformed.  The album has received mixed reviews since its release. It entered the UK charts at number 69.

Production
Strangefolk was produced in collaboration with an all-star team of hit makers and Grammy winners, including Tchad Blake (Peter Gabriel, Crowded House), Sam Williams (Supergrass) and Chris Sheldon (The Foo Fighters, Pixies).

Critical reception
Strangefolk was met with "mixed or average" reviews from critics. At Metacritic, which assigns a weighted average rating out of 100 to reviews from mainstream publications, this release received an average score of 54 based on 8 reviews.

In a review for AllMusic, critic reviewer Stephen Thomas Erlewine wrote: "The British quartet is impervious to time just as they are immune to criticism; they are what they are and nothing will change them, as their 2007 album Strange Folk proves. Ten years on from their briefly successful Noel-rock era debut K, the band sounds exactly the same." At Drowned in Sound, Rob Webb gave a four out of ten stars, explaining the album has "nothing as immediately arresting or as good" as the band's debut album. Jonathan Keefe of Slant Magazine said: "More than a decade removed from their commercial peak, however, Strange Folk should play well to the diehards who remain from their once-sizable fanbase. The Doors-style organ riffs and the trippy flourishes of sitars and finger-cymbals still typify the band's sound; with their fuzzy guitar riffs and a retro fetish that spans centuries rather than decades."

Track listing

Personnel

Band members
Alonza Bevan – bass, vocals, acoustic guitar 
Paul Winter-Hart – drums 
Crispian Mills – lead vocals, guitar, harmonica 
Harry B. Broadbent – piano, Hammond organ, vocals

Additional musician
 Indira Dasi – vocals
 Johnny Kalsi – dhol
 Larli Geary – vocals
 Lalit Krishna – vocals
 Bethany Porter – cello
 Kate Robey – cello
 Dominic Glover – trumpet
 Anthony Bevan − violin
 Emma Hooper – viola
 Ben Castle – saxophone

Production
 Tchad Blake − producer
 Sam Williams
 Richard Haines – engineer
 Louis Reed – engineer
 Peter Hanson – engineer
 Chris Sheldon – mixing, producer
 John Dent – mastering
 David Brinkworth – mixing, producer

Charts

References

External links

Strangefolk at YouTube (streamed copy where licensed)

Kula Shaker albums
2007 albums
Albums produced by Tchad Blake